North Tunica is a census-designated place (CDP) in Tunica County, Mississippi. The population was 1,450 at the 2000 census.

Geography
North Tunica is located at  (34.701643, -90.378253).

Demographics

2020 census

As of the 2020 United States Census, there were 760 people, 281 households, and 181 families residing in the CDP.

2000 census
As of the census of 2000, there were 1,450 people, 425 households, and 333 families residing in the CDP. The racial makeup of the CDP was 4.69% White, 94.90% African American, 0.21% Asian, and 0.21% from two or more races. Hispanic or Latino of any race were 0.41% of the population.

There were 425 households, out of which 40.5% had children under the age of 18 living with them, 26.4% were married couples living together, 46.6% had a female householder with no husband present, and 21.6% were non-families. 19.5% of all households were made up of individuals, and 9.6% had someone living alone who was 65 years of age or older. The average household size was 3.29 and the average family size was 3.76.

In the CDP, the population was spread out, with 36.4% under the age of 18, 13.6% from 18 to 24, 25.2% from 25 to 44, 15.8% from 45 to 64, and 9.0% who were 65 years of age or older. The median age was 25 years. For every 100 females, there were 82.6 males. For every 100 females age 18 and over, there were 75.3 males.

The median income for a household in the CDP was $14,891, and the median income for a family was $16,466. Males had a median income of $16,250 versus $16,985 for females. The per capita income for the CDP was $6,972. About 45.5% of families and 50.7% of the population were below the poverty line, including 60.1% of those under age 18 and 31.4% of those age 65 or over.

Education
North Tunica is served by the Tunica County School District.

References

External links

Census-designated places in Mississippi
Census-designated places in Tunica County, Mississippi
Memphis metropolitan area
Mississippi placenames of Native American origin